Otto Strandman's second cabinet was in office in Estonia from 9 July 1929 to 12 February 1931, when it was succeeded by Konstantin Päts' third cabinet.

Members

This cabinet's members were the following:

References

Cabinets of Estonia